Migmella planifrons is a species of tephritid or fruit flies in the genus Migmella of the family Tephritidae.

Distribution
South Africa.

References

Tephritinae
Insects described in 1869
Diptera of Africa